Cathy Marshall may refer to:

Cathy Marshall (hypertext developer)
Cathy Marshall (news anchor), American television journalist and news anchor
Cathy Marshall (The Bill), character in The Bill

See also
Catherine Marshall (disambiguation)